Stadion Lekkoatletyczno-Piłkarski w Radomiu, officially named Stadion im. It is currently used for association football of Broń Radom.

The sports complex at Narutowicza Street in Radom was built as a voluntary activity by the employees of the State Weapons Factory and put into operation in 1931. It included a football pitch, a cycling track, tennis courts, an athletics track and an outdoor swimming pool. Due to the demolition of the Czachor Brothers Stadium and the construction of a new sports complex in its place, from 2015 on the facility at Narutowicza 9 street, some matches as the host are played by Radomiak Radom. In the first match at the stadium, after Radomiak's return to Ekstraklasa, the hosts sensationally won 3–1 against the Polish champion Legia Warsaw.

In 2019, the 95th edition of the Polish Athletics Championships was organized there.

References 

Sport in Radom
Stadium
Radom
Radom
Buildings and structures in Radom
Sports venues in Masovian Voivodeship